Paddy McIlvenny may refer to:

 Paddy McIlvenny (footballer, born 1900) (1900–?), Irish footballer
 Paddy McIlvenny (footballer, born 1924) (1924–2013), Northern Irish footballer